The Frankfort Light is a lighthouse located on the north breakwater in the harbor in Frankfort, Michigan. The current light was constructed in 1912 and placed on the National Register of Historic Places in 2005.

History

The harbor at Frankfort was first dredged in 1859.  A series of improvements were begun in 1867, with piers completed in 1873. The original Frankfort North Breakwater lighthouse, an enclosed timber-framed pyramid beacon, was built in 1873 at the end of this long wooden pier with an elevated catwalk which led to the shore; the light was first lit on October 15, 1873.  A fog signal was added in 1893.

In 1912, a new square steel pyramidal tower was constructed on the North Pier.  The light was electrified in 1919. In the 1920s, construction began on a pair of concrete breakwaters at the harbor entrance.  Construction was complete by the early 1930s.  With the earlier piers now rendered obsolete, plans were made to shorten them. In 1932, the 1912 lighthouse was removed from the north pier and relocated at the head of the north breakwater. The original pyramid style lighthouse was increased in size by placing it on top of a new two-story addition.

In 2010, the US Coast Guard excessed the lighthouse, and in 2011 ownership was transferred to the city of Frankfort.

Description
The current breakwater light in Frankfort is located at the head of the north breakwater. The cast iron lantern room, surrounded by a gallery, originally contained a fifth order Fresnel lens that was upgraded to a fourth order Fresnel lens. Other structures associated with the light include a radio beacon and a United States Coast Guard station.

Notes

Further reading

 Bibliography on Michigan lighthouses.
 Crompton, Samuel Willard  & Michael J. Rhein, The Ultimate Book of Lighthouses (2002) .
 Hyde, Charles K., and Ann and John Mahan. The Northern Lights: Lighthouses of the Upper Great Lakes.  Detroit: Wayne State University Press, 1995. 
 Jones, Ray & Bruce Roberts, American Lighthouses (Globe Pequot, September 1, 1998, 1st Ed.) .
 Jones, Ray,The Lighthouse Encyclopedia, The Definitive Reference (Globe Pequot, January 1, 2004, 1st ed.) .
 Noble, Dennis, Lighthouses & Keepers: U. S. Lighthouse Service and Its Legacy (Annapolis: U. S. Naval Institute Press, 1997). .
 Oleszewski, Wes, Great Lakes Lighthouses, American and Canadian: A Comprehensive Directory/Guide to Great Lakes Lighthouses, (Gwinn, Michigan: Avery Color Studios, Inc., 1998) .
 Penrod, John, Lighthouses of Michigan, (Berrien Center, Michigan: Penrod/Hiawatha, 1998) .
 Putnam, George R., Lighthouses and Lightships of the United States, (Boston: Houghton Mifflin Co., 1933).
 United States Coast Guard, Aids to Navigation, (Washington, DC: U. S. Government Printing Office, 1945).
 
 
 Wagner, John L., Michigan Lighthouses: An Aerial Photographic Perspective, (East Lansing, Michigan: John L. Wagner, 1998) .
 Wright, Larry and Wright, Patricia, Great Lakes Lighthouses Encyclopedia (Erin: Boston Mills Press, 2006) .

External links

 Aerial photos, Frankfort Lighthouse, marinas.com.
 National Historic Lighthouse Preservation Act FACT SHEET (March 7, 2005).

Lighthouses completed in 1873
Lighthouses completed in 1932
Lighthouses on the National Register of Historic Places in Michigan
Buildings and structures in Benzie County, Michigan
National Register of Historic Places in Benzie County, Michigan